Eilean Musdile (Mansedale) is an islet, and lighthouse to the south west of Lismore in the Inner Hebrides.

The island lies in the entrance to Loch Linnhe, separated from Lismore by a sound ¼ miles across. It is a low-lying rock,  in size, with some grass on it. CalMac ferries pass close to the island on their way from Oban to Mull.

The lighthouse was built by Robert Stevenson in 1833 at a cost of £4260 and initially showed a fixed white light. In 1910 most of the Northern Lighthouse Board's lights were changed to dioptric or Fresnel lenses but Lismore and Fidra, in the Firth of Forth, were left as the only remaining purely catoptric lights in the service.

A Standing Stone once stood on the highest point of the island. The  monolith appears to have recorded the midwinter sunset and is thought to have been removed during construction of the lighthouse.

The skerry of Lady's Rock lies a short distance to the south west.

See also

 List of lighthouses in Scotland
 List of Northern Lighthouse Board lighthouses

Footnotes

External links
 Northern Lighthouse Board 

Lismore, Scotland
Category A listed lighthouses
Archaeological sites in the Northern Inner Hebrides
Lighthouses of Scottish islands
Works of Robert Stevenson (civil engineer)